The 1912–13 English football season was the 25th season in the Football League for Aston Villa.

Andy Ducat's ability and success with England brought attention from bigger clubs than Woolwich Arsenal. His then current club was, at the time, going through a financial crisis. Ducat was finally sold for £1,000 to England's most successful club Aston Villa in 1912, having played 188 matches and scored 21 goals for Arsenal. After suffering a broken leg in his first season at Villa, he recovered to become a stalwart in the side, captaining Villa to their sixth FA Cup win in 1919–20, 

"Happy" Harry Hampton was a prolific goalscorer and scored five goals when Aston Villa beat Wednesday 10–0 in a First Division match in 1912. "The Wellington Whirlwind," played as a centre forward for Aston Villa from 1904 to 1920.

Tommy Barber scored the winning goal for Aston Villa in the 1913 FA Cup Final.

Sam Hardy became one of the best goalkeepers of his generation while at Liverpool. By the time he was allowed to join Villa in 1912 he had earned himself the nickname 'Safe and Steady Sam'. He had made 239 appearances between the sticks for the Reds before he arrived for £1500. He would go on to win  two FA Cups in 1913 and 1920 with Aston Villa.

Final League table

Results

References

External links
AVFC History: 1912–13 season

Aston Villa F.C. seasons
Aston Villa F.C.